In commutative algebra, an integrally closed domain A is an integral domain whose integral closure in its field of fractions is A itself. Spelled out, this means that if x is an element of the field of fractions of A which is a root of a monic polynomial with coefficients in A, then x is itself an element of A. Many well-studied domains are integrally closed: fields, the ring of integers Z, unique factorization domains and regular local rings are all integrally closed.

Note that integrally closed domains appear in the following chain of class inclusions:

Basic properties 
Let A be an integrally closed domain with field of fractions K and let L be a field extension of K. Then x∈L is integral over A if and only if it is algebraic over K and its minimal polynomial over K has coefficients in A.  In particular, this means that any element of L integral over A is root of a monic polynomial in A[X] that is irreducible in K[X]. 

If A is a domain contained in a field K, we can consider the integral closure of A in K (i.e. the set of all elements of K that are integral over A).  This integral closure is an integrally closed domain. 

Integrally closed domains also play a role in the hypothesis of the Going-down theorem. The theorem states that if  A⊆B is an integral extension of domains and A is an integrally closed domain, then the going-down property holds for the extension A⊆B.

Examples 
The following are integrally closed domains.
A principal ideal domain (in particular: the integers and any field).
A unique factorization domain (in particular, any polynomial ring over a field, over the integers, or over any unique factorization domain).
A GCD domain (in particular, any Bézout domain or valuation domain).
A Dedekind domain.
A symmetric algebra over a field (since every symmetric algebra is isomorphic to a polynomial ring in several variables over a field).
Let  be a field of characteristic not 2 and  a polynomial ring over it. In particular,  is an integrally closed domain if .

A is not integrally closed: it has the field of fractions , and the monic polynomial  in the variable X has root t which is in the field of fractions but not in A. This is related to the fact that the plane curve  has a singularity at the origin.

Noetherian integrally closed domain 

For a noetherian local domain A of dimension one, the following are equivalent.
A is integrally closed.
The maximal ideal of A is principal.
A is a discrete valuation ring (equivalently  A is Dedekind.)
A is a regular local ring.

Let A be a noetherian integral domain. Then A is integrally closed if and only if (i) A is the intersection of all localizations  over prime ideals  of height 1 and (ii) the localization  at a prime ideal  of height 1 is a discrete valuation ring.

A noetherian ring is a Krull domain if and only if it is an integrally closed domain.

In the non-noetherian setting, one has the following: an integral domain is integrally closed if and only if it is the intersection of all valuation rings containing it.

Normal rings 

Authors including Serre, Grothendieck, and Matsumura define a normal ring to be a ring whose localizations at prime ideals are integrally closed domains. Such a ring is necessarily a reduced ring, and this is sometimes included in the definition. In general, if A is a Noetherian ring whose localizations at maximal ideals are all domains, then A is a finite product of domains. In particular if A is a Noetherian, normal ring, then the domains in the product are integrally closed domains. Conversely, any finite product of integrally closed domains is normal. In particular, if  is noetherian, normal and connected, then A is an integrally closed domain. (cf. smooth variety)

Let A be a noetherian ring. Then (Serre's criterion) A is normal if and only if it satisfies the following: for any prime ideal ,
If  has height , then  is regular (i.e.,  is a discrete valuation ring.)
If  has height , then  has depth .

Item (i) is often phrased as "regular in codimension 1". Note (i) implies that the set of associated primes  has no embedded primes, and, when (i) is the case, (ii) means that  has no embedded prime for any non-zerodivisor f. In particular, a Cohen-Macaulay ring satisfies (ii). Geometrically, we have the following: if X is a local complete intersection in a nonsingular variety; e.g., X itself is nonsingular, then X is Cohen-Macaulay; i.e., the stalks  of the structure sheaf are Cohen-Macaulay for all prime ideals p. Then we can say: X is normal (i.e., the stalks of its structure sheaf are all normal) if and only if it is regular in codimension 1.

Completely integrally closed domains 
Let A be a domain and K its field of fractions. An element x in K is said to be almost integral over A  if the subring A[x] of K generated by A and x is a fractional ideal of A; that is, if there is a  such that  for all . Then A is said to be completely integrally closed if every almost integral element of K is contained in A. A completely integrally closed domain is integrally closed. Conversely, a noetherian integrally closed domain is completely integrally closed.

Assume A is completely integrally closed. Then the formal power series ring  is completely integrally closed. This is significant since the analog is false for an integrally closed domain: let R be a valuation domain of height at least 2 (which is integrally closed.) Then  is not integrally closed. Let L be a field extension of K. Then the integral closure of A in L is completely integrally closed.

An integral domain is completely integrally closed if and only if the monoid of divisors of A is a group.

See also: Krull domain.

"Integrally closed" under constructions 
The following conditions are equivalent for an integral domain A:
 A is integrally closed;
 Ap (the localization of A with respect to p) is integrally closed for every prime ideal p;
 Am is integrally closed for every maximal ideal m.

1 → 2 results immediately from the preservation of integral closure under localization; 2 → 3 is trivial; 3 → 1 results from the preservation of integral closure under localization, the exactness of localization, and the property that an A-module M is zero if and only if its localization with respect to every maximal ideal is zero.

In contrast, the "integrally closed" does not pass over quotient, for Z[t]/(t2+4) is not integrally closed.

The localization of a completely integrally closed domain need not be completely integrally closed.

A direct limit of integrally closed domains is an integrally closed domain.

Modules over an integrally closed domain 

Let A be a Noetherian integrally closed domain.

An ideal I of A is divisorial if and only if every associated prime of A/I has height one.

Let P denote the set of all prime ideals in A of height one. If T is a finitely generated torsion module, one puts:
,
which makes sense as a formal sum; i.e., a divisor. We write  for the divisor class of d.

See also 
Unibranch local ring

Citations

References 

 
 
 
 
 

Commutative algebra